WCMP (1350 AM) is a radio station in Pine City, Minnesota. It has a classic country format, and broadcasts 24 hours a day. The station first signed on in 1957.  It started out as a Full Service MOR station broadcasting only through the day hours, but transformed into Full Service AC in the mid-1980s.

It is owned by Alan R. Quarnstrom, through licensee Q Media Properties, and has studios at 15429 Pokegama Lake Rd. This facility is shared with sister station WCMP-FM.  Its signal can be heard with in a six-county area.

On September 16, 2016, Red Rock Radio announced that it would sell WCMP and WCMP-FM to Q Media Properties; the sale was completed on November 30, 2016 at a purchase price of $300,000. On April 17, 2017, WCMP changed their format from adult standards to classic hits, branded as "Pine Hits 106". Since then, WCMP quietly rebranded as "Highway 106.5" with no change in format.

On November 16, 2020, WCMP flipped to classic country, branded as "Anthem Country".

Former logo

References

External links

Classic country radio stations in the United States
Pine County, Minnesota
Radio stations established in 1957
1957 establishments in Minnesota
Radio stations in Minnesota